Ginette Grandmont is a politician from Quebec, Canada. She was an Action démocratique du Québec Member of the National Assembly for the electoral district of Masson from 2007 to 2008.

Background

She is from Drummondville and relocated to Charlemagne. She holds a degree from the Institut d'hôtellerie du Québec and worked as a real estate broker for nearly 20 years with Re-Max and Royal LePage. She was also the owner of a RE/MAX franchise in Saint-Jean-sur-Richelieu for five years, and a volunteer for Operation Red Nose and Operation Enfant Soleil.

Member of the Provincial Legislature

Grandmont was first elected in the 2007 election with 44% of the vote. Parti Québécois incumbent Luc Thériault finished second with 36% of the vote. Grandmont took office on April 12, 2007. She ran again in the 2008 election but was defeated by PQ candidate Guillaume Tremblay.

Federal politics

She campaigned on behalf of local Conservative candidate Claude Carignan during the federal election of 2008.  Carignan finished a distant second against Bloc Québécois candidate Luc Desnoyers in the district of Rivière-des-Mille-Îles.

Footnotes

External links
 

Action démocratique du Québec MNAs
Living people
Women MNAs in Quebec
Year of birth missing (living people)
People from Drummondville
People from Charlemagne, Quebec
21st-century Canadian politicians
21st-century Canadian women politicians